Versam is a former municipality in the district of Surselva in the canton of Graubünden in Switzerland.  The municipalities of Valendas, Versam, Safien and Tenna merged on 1 January 2013 into the new municipality of Safiental.

History
Versam is first mentioned in 1050 as a valle Versamia.

Geography

Of this area, 16.8% is used for agricultural purposes, while 70.6% is forested. Of the rest of the land, 2% is settled (buildings or roads) and the remainder (10.6%) is non-productive (rivers, glaciers or mountains).

The former municipality is located in the Ilanz sub-district of the Surselva district.  It is located above the Vorderrhein canyon at the entrance to the Safien Valley.  It consists of the linear village of Versam and the hamlets of Versam-Station, Arezen, Calörtsch and Sculms.

Demographics
Versam had a population (as of 2011) of 226.{  , 4.0% of the population was made up of foreign nationals.  Over the last 10 years the population has decreased at a rate of -18.5%.  Most of the population speaks German (98.0%), with Romansh being second most common ( 1.6%) and Spanish being third ( 0.4%).

, the gender distribution of the population was 48.6% male and 51.4% female.  The age distribution, in Versam is; 35 children or 13.7% of the population are between 0 and 9 years old and 33 teenagers or 12.9% are between 10 and 19.  Of the adult population, 12 people or 4.7% of the population are between 20 and 29 years old.  41 people or 16.1% are between 30 and 39, 36 people or 14.1% are between 40 and 49, and 25 people or 9.8% are between 50 and 59.  The senior population distribution is 29 people or 11.4% of the population are between 60 and 69 years old, 25 people or 9.8% are between 70 and 79, there are 15 people or 5.9% who are between 80 and 89 there are 4 people or 1.6% who are between 90 and 99.

In the 2007 federal election the most popular party was the SVP which received 42.6% of the vote.  The next three most popular parties were the SP (30.7%), the FDP (16.7%) and the CVP (9.1%).

In Versam about 78.9% of the population (between age 25-64) have completed either non-mandatory upper secondary education or additional higher education (either university or a Fachhochschule).

Versam has an unemployment rate of 0.52%.  , there were 41 people employed in the primary economic sector and about 17 businesses involved in this sector.  7 people are employed in the secondary sector and there are 3 businesses in this sector.  52 people are employed in the tertiary sector, with 9 businesses in this sector.

The historical population is given in the following table:

Transport

To reach the village directly, a Postauto bus service provides a connection, which also serves Thalkirch and Tenna.

References

External links
 Official website 
 

Safiental
Villages in Graubünden
Former municipalities of Graubünden